Shelleyan Orphan were a British alternative music group that peaked during the 1980s and early 1990s. They played a style of pop influenced by chamber music, and which featured dual male-female vocals.

Career
In 1980, Caroline Crawley and Jemaur Tayle met in Bournemouth, England, where they discovered a mutual appreciation of poet Percy Bysshe Shelley. Two years later, after taking the name Shelleyan Orphan from the Shelley poem Spirit of Solitude, the pair moved to London to seek out orchestral elements to add to their voices.

In June 1984, the band got their first break and landed a session with Richard Skinner for BBC Radio 1. The band signed with Rough Trade Records in 1986 and released the singles, "Cavalry of Cloud" and "Anatomy of Love".

In 1987, the band released their first of four albums: Helleborine. Named after the Helleborine orchid said to have the power to cure madness, the album was recorded at Abbey Road Studios with producer Haydn Bendall. Helleborine included an assortment of guest musicians including Stuart Elliott (the drummer for Kate Bush), and Kate's brother Paddy Bush.

In 1989, they released Century Flower. So called after a flower that blooms only once in its lifetime, this album was intended to mark "an event which affects enormous change, maybe once in a century: on a world scale, the atomic bomb: on a personal level, the death of someone close to you". Produced by David M. Allen, the band's sound caught the ear of The Cure's Robert Smith, who invited the band to accompany them on their Prayer Tour. While on that tour, Caroline Crawley began a relationship with Cure drummer Boris Williams.

In 1991, the band received another break when Crawley was approached by 4AD Records founder Ivo Watts-Russell who asked her to appear on four tracks of This Mortal Coil's Blood. Crawley was permitted to do her own interpretations of the tracks, and appeared in the video for the Syd Barrett cover, "Late Night". With Jem Tayle, Shelleyan Orphan recorded and released tracks for several compilation albums during this period.

In 1992, Shelleyan Orphan returned with their album Humroot. Named after Tayle's childhood dog, Humroot was recorded by Bill Buchanan, and the band were joined by Boris Williams, Porl Thompson (The Cure) and Roberto Soave (Presence).

Shortly after Humroots release, Shelleyan Orphan disbanded. Tayle formed his own band, Elephantine, and Crawley, along with Williams and Soave, formed Babacar. Soon after, Tayle joined Babacar as a full-time member, though not contributing to the songwriting.

In 2000, the band reunited to record a cover of Tim Buckley's "Buzzin' Fly" for Sing a Song for You: A Tribute to Tim Buckley.

A new album, entitled We Have Everything We Need, was released in October 2008 on One Little Indian Records.

In October 2016 Caroline Crawley died after a long illness.

DiscographyAlbums Helleborine Rough Trade, 1987 (LP/CD) - UK Indie No. 5
 Helleborine (US Version) Columbia, 1988(?). (LP/CD)
 Century Flower Rough Trade, 1989 (CD) - UK Indie No. 19
 Century Flower (US Version) Columbia, 1989 (CD)
 Humroot Columbia/Rough Trade, 1992 (CD)
 We Have Everything We Need One Little Indian, 2008 (CD)Singles "Cavalry of Cloud" Rough Trade, 1986 (7"/12")
 "Anatomy of Love" Rough Trade, 1987 (7"/12") - UK Indie No. 12
 "Shatter" Rough Trade, 1989 (7"/12") - US Billboard Hot Modern Rock Tracks No. 22Promotional EP Cavalry of Cloud Rough Trade, 1986 (CD)
 Century Flower (Japanese Promo) Columbia, 1990 (CD)
 Waking Up Columbia/Rough Trade, 1992 (CD)Compilations'''
 "Suffer Dog" The Liberator, Artists for Animals Deltic Records, 1989 (CD)
 "Ice" on Acoustic Christmas Columbia/Sony, 1990 (CD)
 "Shatter" on "Rough Trade Summer Collection 1991" (Brazilian Rough Trade Compilation with acts like James (band), Pere Ubu, AR Kane and others)
 "Who Loves the Sun" on Heaven & Hell - A Tribute To The Velvet Underground (Volume Two) Imaginary Records, 1991 (CD)
 "Joey" on Brittle Days - A Tribute To Nick Drake Imaginary Records, 1992 (CD)
 "Ice" on A Different Kind of Christmas Risky Business, 1994 (CD)
 "Buzzin' Fly" on Sing a Song for You: A Tribute to Tim Buckley Manifesto Records, 2000 (CD)

References

External links
 Live video from Travelling Folk on BBC Scotland - January 2009
 Detailed discography (new link)''
 Review of "Ice" by WWUH Radio
 Babacar (side project after Humroot)

English alternative rock groups
English rock music groups
English new wave musical groups
Musical groups established in 1980